× Bifrenidium, abbreviated in trade journals Bifdm, is an intergeneric hybrid between the orchid genera Bifrenaria and Cymbidium (Bif x Cym).

References 

Cymbidieae
Orchid nothogenera